, son of regent Nijō Yoshitada, was a Japanese kugyō (court noble) of the Edo period. He adopted Kujō Yukinori's son who became known as Nijō Munemoto.

Family 
Parents
Father: Nijō Yoshitada (二条 吉忠, 26 September 1689– 28 August 1737)
Mother: a Court lady (家女房)
Consorts and issues: 
Wife: Unknown name
Adopted children: Nijō Munemoto (二条 宗基, June 8, 1727 – February 9, 1754),  son of Kujō Yukinori

References
 

1718 births
1738 deaths
Fujiwara clan
Munehira